HD 42818 is a suspected astrometric binary star system in the northern circumpolar constellation of Camelopardalis. It is visible to the naked eye with an apparent visual magnitude of +4.76.

The visible member, designated component A, is an A-type main-sequence star with a stellar classification of A0 Vn, where the 'n' indicates "nebulous" absorption lines due to rotation. This may be coming from a cooler, unseen companion.

The primary has an estimated 2.49 times the mass of the Sun and about 2.7 times the Sun's radius. It is a relatively young star, about 99 million years old.

References

A-type main-sequence stars
Astrometric binaries
Camelopardalis (constellation)
Durchmusterung objects
042818
029997
2209